These hits topped the Dutch Top 40 in 1988.

See also
1988 in music

References

1988 in the Netherlands
1988 record charts
1988